The Decks Ran Red (also called Infamy) is a 1958 MGM seagoing suspense drama based on the book Infamy at Sea, and directed by Andrew L. Stone. The feature starred James Mason, Dorothy Dandridge, Broderick Crawford, and Stuart Whitman.

The film received generally poor reviews, but received wide viewership for Dorothy Dandridge's role. Filming took place in southern California aboard the Chios, Greece-registered SS Igor (originally the Philip C. Shera), a World War II Liberty Ship owned by the Los and Pezas shipowning families.

Plot

The SS Berwind is a rusty old ship chartered by the line to meet high demand. The captain of the Berwind has died and the coroner wants an autopsy due to the suspicious circumstances of the death, which has caused several crew members to leave the ship. In need of a captain, Vic (Harlan Warde) and Mr. Adams (Jonathan Hole) meet with the "White Fleet" S.S. Mariposa First Officer, Edwin 'Ed' Rummill (James Mason) and his wife Joan (Katharine Bard) to offer him the Berwind. Ed has applied for captain vacancies for five years but has little chance of getting one of the main ships of the line. He is warned of the recent problems by Vic, but agrees—against the emotional pleas of his wife—to join the Berwind in New Zealand.

Henry Scott (Broderick Crawford) and Mace (David Cross) work in the loud and hot engine room of the Berwind. Scott says he's upset that the Berwind's current First Officer, Mr. Moody (Hank Patterson), hasn't been offered the Captain's position (due to his old age of 76).  In fact, Scott intends to use this decision to rile the crew as he puts into action his plan of mutiny. While the ship's deceased captain noted in the log that Scott is an "Exemplary Seaman," Mace knows that Scott has been responsible for stirring up problems among the crew several times.

Scott says he needs a second partner who is good with a gun, to assist him and Leroy Martin (Stuart Whitman) in a mutiny plan he has been working on for years while researching maritime history and law. Letting Mace know he has found out his secret—he's an ex-con who robbed a liquor store last year—Scott traps him into being the third partner. Scott lays out his plan to make a million dollars by “steaming up” the crew into a mutiny, killing the officers (and eventually the entire crew) to make it look like they abandoned a sinking ship, thus leaving the partners in possession of a ship which they can sell off for salvage value.

Scott and Leroy proceed to foment anger among the crew due to Moody being overlooked for promotion.  The new captain arrives to find a poorly kept ship, an unhappy Moody and a lack of key crew that have left the ship. In need of a cook and steward, the captain hires a local Māori couple—Pete (Joel Fluellen) as the cook, and his beautiful wife Mahia (Dorothy Dandridge) as the steward.

Setting out to sea Capt. Rummill is optimistic, while Scott and Leroy force Mace to choose between joining the partnership or being thrown overboard. In the officer’s saloon, officer Alex Cole (Jack Kruschen) warns Rummill about the devious nature of Scott and Leroy. Moody dies early in the journey, of what is believed by the crew to be a broken heart, further inflaming the crew against the new captain.

One day Scott enrages Pete by letting him overhear that his wife (Mahia) will be seduced by Leroy.  A butcher-knife-wielding Pete confronts Leroy while he is attacking Mahia, knocking out Leroy causing Pete to be confined to his cabin. Mace continues to be distraught over being part of the conspiracy and is still having nightmares that cause him to sleep-talk about the plan. Having warned Mace to never do this again, Scott and Leroy honor their threats and throw Mace overboard, making him the first known victim. After the officers discover that Mace is missing, Scott shows a gun he says he’s found to the captain, warning that a mutiny may be afoot and that Mace may have been murdered.

Due to concerns over what is going on, the captain moves Mahia to a cabin across from him, allowing her access to his cabin to borrow a book to read. Scott uses this event to launch the mutiny plan he's waited nine years to enact. Scott and Leroy try to convince the captain that the crew will mutiny because Mahia has been seen in his room and it is believed the captain has locked up Pete and moved Mahia near him so he would be able to attack her.

Trying to uncover what is going on, the captain questions several crew members but this doesn't reveal any concerns of which Scott warned. Scott then convinces the crew to set Pete free. With tensions mounting and no bullets for the gun Scott found and gave to the captain, one officer says he’s brought aboard an old German Luger with a few rounds.

Scott and Leroy call the crew together to convince them to mutiny against a captain who Scott says needs to be turned into the Line for taking advantage of Mahia. The crew begins to suspect Scott has been lying to them all along, then a crewman reveals that he heard Mace's screams and that he believes Scott and Leroy killed Mace. The planned mutiny having backfired, Scott convinces Leroy they must kill the whole crew before the crew can join the officers against them.

Hearing a sound, the officers rush to find the ship's radio has been destroyed. Scott and Leroy uncover their hidden stash of a rifle and handgun while the officers have only knives and the Luger.  In the meantime, the crew follows previous orders by locking Pete back in his cabin; showing that they will not mutiny. Taking their rifle to the loud engine room, Scott kills a crew member at point-blank range and forces Leroy to kill the second. Seeing this, another of the crew attempts to warn the others, only to be killed by Scott. Not hearing the shots, the fourth engine room crewman is murdered by Scott.

The officers realize that no one can be contacted in the engine room, and go to find the bodies and that the engine is slowing due to the ship taking on water as part of Scott's plan to make it appear that the crew abandoned a sinking ship. The sinking is stopped, and the captain warns that the crew not be informed so they won't try to go for the lifeboats and be also killed.

The officers order the remaining crew to assemble in the saloon, where it's revealed that three crew members are missing and that Pete and Mahia were told to stay in their cabins. The captain orders new First Officer Jim Osborne (Guy Kingsford) to stay with the lone pistol in the salon to protect the crew while the ship's Chief, "Bull" Pringle (John Gallaudet), goes to find Pete, and the captain searches for Mahia.

Scott, armed with the rifle, intends to start at the bridge and work his way down to kill everyone while Leroy stays on deck with the handgun. Finding Mahia in bed asleep, Rummill warns her of the killings. After Mahia dresses they flee from a pursuing Scott only to be saved at the last second by a covering shot from Osborne. Bull attempts to evade Leroy to make it to Pete, not knowing Pete has already joined the crew in the saloon. Hearing a shot that Leroy has taken while wounding Bull, Pete grabs his butcher's knife to go to Bull's aide. While protecting Bull, Pete is killed by Leroy, allowing Bull time to escape. Bull, making it back to the saloon, reveals Pete and two other crewmen (including Elliott) are dead. Mahia tells the captain he is a coward to not pursue Scott and Leroy, and the captain tries to settle a panicking crew.

With Mahia having gone for her husband and the crew taking to the lifeboat, the captain stays to fight (voluntarily supported by three officers without children). Before the escape, though, Scott traps Mahia on deck. Having Mahia in his sights, Scott gives the officers and crew 60 seconds to get in the lifeboats and leave.

Knowing that alone on sea in a lifeboat the crew will all surely die, and with seconds to act, the captain hatches a risky plan. He realized that Elliot, who was last known to be taking a reading of the ship's speed using a Chip log, may have been killed before he pulled in the log and its line floating behind the ship. The captain surmises that he could abandon ship, but then use the line from the log to climb back aboard. He orders the crew to abandon ship, with Scott and Leroy planning to keep Mahia aboard with them. With the lifeboat away, Scott and Leroy return to the engine room to restart the engines and continue their plan of partially sinking the ship. Scott then goes to the bridge to pilot the ship, leaving Leroy to run the engines.

Having rowed a distance from the ship, the captain and officer Pringle then fight the cold water to swim back to the stern of the ship. Pringle, though, is unable to keep up and eventually drowns, as the captain must leave him in order to have any chance of making it to the ship before Scott and Leroy get it underway again. Rummill makes it to the log line just as engine pressure is restored. With the propeller now turning below, he must make an impossible climb to the deck. Once aboard, though, Rummill finds Mahia and takes a knife from the kitchen since his wet gun is now not reliable.

Mahia advises the captain to try to kill the weaker Leroy first with the knife before going after Scott on the bridge. She convinces Rummill of her plan to put Leroy off-guard down in the engine room by claiming Scott has attacked her. Mahia tells Leroy that Scott has promised her half the money, and that Scott will eventually kill Leroy. Mahia convinces Leroy they can be together instead, and as they begin to kiss she takes Leroy's handgun from his back pocket and shoots him twice, leading to his slow death.

Scott, still on the bridge, steers the ship towards the lifeboat to kill the remaining crew. When he is not able to contact Leroy to change the ship's speed, he rushes unarmed to the engine room where he is confronted by a knife-wielding Rummill. Seeing Leroy's handgun on the engine room floor below, Scott leaps for it and fires at Rummill; only to realize the gun is empty. Rummill then leaps on and fatally stabs Scott, while in the sea the crew evades the ship bearing down on them.

With ten crewmen now dead, the movie ends with those remaining on the lifeboat cheering their rescue by Rummill, who is now back in command.

Cast

 James Mason as Capt. Edwin Rummill
 Dorothy Dandridge as Mahia, Pete's Wife
 Broderick Crawford as Henry Scott, Mutineer
 Stuart Whitman as Leroy Martin, Scott's Accomplice
 Katharine Bard as Joan Rumill
 Jack Kruschen as Alex Cole
 John Gallaudet as "Bull" Pringle
 Barney Phillips as Karl Pope
 David R. Cross as Mace
 Hank Patterson as Mr. Moody
 Harry Bartell as Tom Walsh
 Joel Fluellen as Pete the Cook
 Guy Kingsford as Jim Osborne
 Jonathan Hole as Mr. Adams
 Harlan Warde as Vic
 Joel Marston as Russ Hendersen
 Ed Hinton as Mansard
 Marshall Kent as Sammy
 Robert Christopher as Seaman
 Art Lewis as Seaman

Reception
According to MGM records the film earned $365,000 in the US and Canada and $435,000 elsewhere resulting in a loss of $273,000.

References

External links

 
 
 
 

1958 films
American black-and-white films
Metro-Goldwyn-Mayer films
Films directed by Andrew L. Stone
1958 adventure films
1950s crime films
Seafaring films
1950s English-language films